Natriciteres pembana, the variable marsh snake, is a species of natricine snake found on Pemba Island in Tanzania.

References

Natriciteres
Reptiles of Tanzania
Reptiles described in 1935
Taxa named by Arthur Loveridge